Elista International Airport  is an international airport located near the city of Elista in the Republic of Kalmykia of Russia. The airport has been closed since 24 February 2022 due to the conflict in Ukraine.

Airlines and destinations

References

External links
Elista Airport website 

Airports built in the Soviet Union
Airports in Kalmykia
Buildings and structures in Elista